Juan Carlos "Charly" Flores (born July 30, 1997) is an American soccer player.

Career
Charly Flores joined Houston Dynamo's academy in 2013, and signed with Houston's United Soccer League affiliate club Rio Grande Valley FC Toros in December 2015.

References

External links
 

1997 births
Living people
American soccer players
Rio Grande Valley FC Toros players
USL Championship players
Soccer players from Houston
United States men's under-20 international soccer players
Association football forwards